Ooni Akinmoyero was the 38th Ooni of Ife, a paramount traditional ruler of Ile Ife, the ancestral home of the Yorubas. He succeeded Ooni Ojigidiri and was succeeded by  
Ooni Gbanlare.

References

Oonis of Ife
Yoruba history